Red Bull Bragantino, commonly known as Bragantino, is a Brazilian football club based in Bragança Paulista, São Paulo. It competes in the Série A, the top tier of the Brazilian football league system, as well as in the Campeonato Paulista Série A1, the highest level of the São Paulo state football league.

The club was known as Clube Atlético Bragantino, before club administration was taken over by Red Bull GmbH in 2020 who renamed the club and changed its colours from its traditional black and white to red and white.

Although the partnership began in April 2019, during the 2019 Campeonato Brasileiro Série B (second division of Brazilian football), the team was called 'Bragantino' and Red Bull appeared only as a sponsor. In the 2020 season the name changed to 'Red Bull Bragantino'.

In their first season, they were champions of the 2019 Série B being promoted to the Série A and qualifying for the 2020 Copa do Brasil round of 16.

History

On 8 January 1928 former Bragança Futebol Clube members founded the Clube Atlético Bragantino.

In 1949 the club played in the Campeonato Paulista Second Division for the first time. In 1965 Bragantino was promoted to the Campeonato Paulista First Division for the first time. In 1966, however, the club was relegated to the Campeonato Paulista Second Division.

In 1988 Bragantino was the Campeonato Paulista Second Division champion. In 1989 the club was promoted to the Campeonato Brasileiro Série A for the first time after winning the Campeonato Brasileiro Série B. In 1990 Bragantino defeated the Novorizontino to win the Campeonato Paulista First Division. The final was nicknamed the caipira final (final caipira, in Portuguese language).

In 1991 the club was the Campeonato Brasileiro Série A runner-up. In the final, Bragantino was defeated by São Paulo. In 1992 the club competed in the Copa CONMEBOL, debuting in international competitions. In 1993 Bragantino competed in the Copa CONMEBOL for the second time. In 1995 the club was relegated to the Campeonato Paulista Second Division. In 1996 Bragantino competed in the Copa CONMEBOL for the third time.

In 1998 the club was relegated to the Campeonato Brasileiro Série B. In 2002, after a poor campaign, Bragantino were relegated to the Campeonato Brasileiro Série C. In 2005 the club was promoted to the Campeonato Paulista First Division. In 2007 Bragantino won the Campeonato Brasileiro Série C thus being promoted to the following year's Campeonato Brasileiro Série B.

In April 2019 Bragantino signed a deal with Red Bull GmbH handling over management of all their football-related assets. From 2020 a new logo and the name of Red Bull Bragantino was introduced.

Stadium

Red Bull Bragantino's stadium is the Estádio Nabi Abi Chedid, built in 1949 with a maximum capacity of 21,210 people. The stadium, owned by the Clube Atlético Bragantino, honors Nabi Abi Chedid, a former president of the club and father of present president Marco Antônio Abi Chedid. It had previously been named the Estádio Marcelo Stéfani, in honor of Marcelo Stéfani, a player and former president of the club. As Estádio Marcelo Stéfani, the stadium was also known by the nickname Marcelão. The name change was effected on 6 January 2009 amid criticism from the Bragança Paulista population.

Season records

{|class="wikitable"
|-bgcolor="#efefef"
! Season
! Div.
! Pos.
! Pl.
! W
! D
! L
! GS
! GA
! Pts.
! style="width:15%;"|Copa do Brasil
!colspan=2|CONMEBOL
|-
!align=center colspan="13"|As Clube Atlético Bragantino
|-
|align=center|2002
|align=center rowspan="1"|Série B
|align=center|26
|align=center|25
|align=center|4
|align=center|5
|align=center|16
|align=center|23
|align=center|54
|align=center|17
|align=center|First round
|align=center colspan="2"|DNP
|-
|align=center|2003
|align=center rowspan="1"|Série C
|align=center|6
|align=center|12
|align=center|7
|align=center|2
|align=center|3
|align=center|20
|align=center|15
|align=center|23
|align=center|DNP
|align=center colspan="2"|DNP
|-
|align=center|2004
|align=center colspan="9"|DNP
|align=center colspan="1"|DNP
|align=center colspan="2"|DNP
|-
|align=center|2005
|align=center colspan="9"|DNP
|align=center colspan="1"|DNP
|align=center colspan="2"|DNP
|-
|align=center|2006
|align=center colspan="9"|DNP
|align=center colspan="1"|DNP
|align=center colspan="2"|DNP
|-
|align=center|2007
|align=center rowspan="1"|Série C
|align=center bgcolor="gold"|1
|align=center|32
|align=center|16
|align=center|7
|align=center|9
|align=center|46
|align=center|32
|align=center|55
|align=center|DNP
|align=center colspan="2"|DNP
|-
|align=center|2008
|align=center rowspan="1"|Série B
|align=center|7
|align=center|38
|align=center|16
|align=center|9
|align=center|13
|align=center|47
|align=center|41
|align=center|57
|align=center|Second round
|align=center colspan="2"|DNP
|-
|align=center|2009
|align=center rowspan="1"|Série B
|align=center|9
|align=center|38
|align=center|15
|align=center|8
|align=center|15
|align=center|52
|align=center|51
|align=center|53
|align=center|DNP
|align=center colspan="2"|DNP
|-
|align=center|2010
|align=center rowspan="1"|Série B
|align=center|8
|align=center|38
|align=center|13
|align=center|14
|align=center|11
|align=center|52
|align=center|37
|align=center|53
|align=center|DNP
|align=center colspan="2"|DNP
|-
|align=center|2011
|align=center rowspan="1"|Série B
|align=center|6
|align=center|38
|align=center|16
|align=center|10
|align=center|12
|align=center|65
|align=center|53
|align=center|58
|align=center|DNP
|align=center colspan="2"|DNP
|-
|align=center|2012
|align=center rowspan="1"|Série B
|align=center|14
|align=center|38
|align=center|12
|align=center|8
|align=center|18
|align=center|45
|align=center|53
|align=center|44
|align=center|DNP
|align=center colspan="2"|DNP
|-
|align=center|2013
|align=center rowspan="1"|Série B
|align=center|16
|align=center|38
|align=center|13
|align=center|8
|align=center|17
|align=center|37
|align=center|43
|align=center|47
|align=center|Second round
|align=center colspan="2"|DNP
|-
|align=center|2014
|align=center rowspan="1"|Série B
|align=center|16
|align=center|38
|align=center|13
|align=center|7
|align=center|18
|align=center|45
|align=center|55
|align=center|46
|align=center|Round of 16
|align=center colspan="2"|DNP
|-
|align=center|2015
|align=center rowspan="1"|Série B
|align=center|6
|align=center|38
|align=center|19
|align=center|3
|align=center|16
|align=center|56
|align=center|66
|align=center|60
|align=center|Second round
|align=center colspan="2"|DNP
|-
|align=center|2016
|align=center rowspan="1"|Série B
|align=center|19
|align=center|38
|align=center|8
|align=center|8
|align=center|22
|align=center|30
|align=center|54
|align=center|32
|align=center|Third round
|align=center colspan="2"|DNP
|-
|align=center|2017
|align=center|Série C
|align=center|7
|align=center|18
|align=center|4
|align=center|9
|align=center|5
|align=center|16
|align=center|19
|align=center|21
|align=center|Second round
|align=center colspan="2"|DNP
|-
|align=center|2018
|align=center|Série C
|align=center|4
|align=center|22
|align=center|9
|align=center|8
|align=center|5
|align=center|25
|align=center|18
|align=center|35
|align=center|Third round
|align=center colspan="2"|DNP
|-
|align=center|2019
|align=center|Série B
|align=center bgcolor="gold"|1
|align=center|38
|align=center|22
|align=center|9
|align=center|7
|align=center|64
|align=center|27
|align=center|78
|align=center|DNP
|align=center colspan="2"|DNP
|-
!align=center colspan="13"|As Red Bull Bragantino
|-
|align=center|2020
|align=center|Série A
|align=center|10
|align=center|38
|align=center|13
|align=center|14
|align=center|11
|align=center|50
|align=center|40
|align=center|53
|align=center|First round
|align=center colspan="2"|DNP
|-
|align=center|2021
|align=center|Série A
|align=center|6
|align=center|38
|align=center|14
|align=center|14
|align=center|10
|align=center|55
|align=center|46
|align=center|56
|align=center|Third round
|align=center|CS
|align=center bgcolor="silver"|Runners-up
|-
|align=center|2022
|align=center|Série A
|align=center|14
|align=center|38
|align=center|11
|align=center|11
|align=center|16
|align=center|49
|align=center|59
|align=center|44
|align=center|Third round
|align=center|CL
|align=center|Group stage
|-
|}

Current squad

Reserve team

Out on loan

Personnel

Current staff

Honours

International 

 Copa Sudamericana
 Runners-up: 2021

Domestic 

Campeonato Brasileiro Série A:
 Runners-up: 1991*

Campeonato Brasileiro Série B:
 Winners (2): 1989*, 2019*

Campeonato Brasileiro Série C:
 Winners: 2007*

State 

Campeonato Paulista:
 Winners: 1990*

Campeonato Paulista Série A2: 2
 Winners (2): 1965*, 1988*

Campeonato Paulista Série B2: 1
 Winners: 1979*

 Campeonato Paulista do Interior: 1
 Winners: 2020

*Titles before 2020, as Clube Atlético Bragantino

See also
 RB Leipzig
 New York Red Bulls
 FC Red Bull Salzburg
 FC Liefering
 Red Bull Ghana
 Red Bull Brasil

References

External links 
 Official Website

 
Football clubs in São Paulo (state)
1928 establishments in Brazil
Association football clubs established in 1928
Red Bull sports teams
Clube Atlético Bragantino